The Woman's Law is a lost 1916 American silent drama film directed by Lawrence B. McGill and starring Florence Reed. It was distributed through Pathé Exchange.

Cast
Florence Reed as Gail Orcutt
Duncan McRae as George Orcutt / Keith Edgerton
Anita d'Este Scott as Mrs. Lorme, Gail's Friend
Jack Curtis as Vance Orcutt (credited as Master Jack Curtis)
Lora Rogers as Vance's Governess
John Webb Dillon as John Kent
William A. Williams as Frank Fisher
Philip Hahn as Lucas Emmet

References

External links

1916 films
American silent feature films
Lost American films
American black-and-white films
Silent American drama films
1916 drama films
1916 lost films
Lost drama films
Arrow Film Corporation films
1910s English-language films
1910s American films